Bruce Hamilton (born June 30, 1957) is a Canadian ice hockey executive and retired player. He is the current owner, president and general manager of the Kelowna Rockets.

Career 
Hamilton was selected by the St. Louis Blues in the 5th round (81st overall) of the 1977 NHL amateur draft.

Hamilton played four seasons of professional hockey, including 81 games in the International Hockey League with the Flint Generals, Port Huron Flags, and Milwaukee Admirals.

Following his playing career, Hamilton worked as a scout, first in the WHL with the Saskatoon Blades (1981 to 1984), and then in the NHL with the Hartford Whalers (1987 to 1989) and Washington Capitals (1989 to 1991). In 1991 he entered the WHL as the owner of the Tacoma Rockets franchise which moved to Kelowna in 1995.

Personal life
His son, Curtis, played with the Edmonton Oilers during the 2014–15 NHL season.

Career statistics

References

External links

Living people
1957 births
Baltimore Clippers players
Canadian ice hockey coaches
Canadian ice hockey left wingers
Flint Generals players
Milwaukee Admirals players
Port Huron Flags players
Saskatoon Blades players
St. Louis Blues draft picks
Sportspeople from Saskatoon
Ice hockey people from Saskatchewan
Western International Hockey League players